This is a list of the largest trading partners of Russia based on data from The Observatory of Economic Complexity (OEC).

See also
Economy of Russia
List of the largest trading partners of the European Union
List of the largest trading partners of the ASEAN

References

Foreign trade of Russia
Economy-related lists of superlatives
Lists of trading partners